The Caldwell Odd Fellow Home for the Aged in Caldwell, Idaho was built in 1920.  It was designed by Tourtellotte & Hummel and built by C. E. Silbaugh with aspects of Late 19th and 20th Century Revivals architecture and Second Renaissance Revival architecture.  It was listed on the National Register of Historic Places in 1982.

It was studied in a 1982 study of Tourtellotte and Hummel architecture.

The home no longer belongs to the Odd Fellows.

References

Residential buildings on the National Register of Historic Places in Idaho
Residential buildings completed in 1920
Buildings and structures in Canyon County, Idaho
Odd Fellows buildings in Idaho
Renaissance Revival architecture in Idaho
Caldwell, Idaho
National Register of Historic Places in Canyon County, Idaho